The fascia of perineum (deep perineal fascia, superficial investing fascia of perineum or Gallaudet fascia) is the fascia which covers the muscles of the superficial perineal pouch.  The muscles surrounded by the deep perineal fascia are the bulbospongiosus, ischiocavernosus, and superficial transverse perineal.
The fascia is attached laterally to the ischiopubic rami and fused anteriorly with the suspensory ligament of the penis or clitoris.  It is continuous anteriorly with the deep investing fascia of the abdominal wall muscles, and in males, it is continuous with Buck's fascia.

Fascia